Haruna Iddrisu (born 8 September 1970) is a Ghanaian lawyer and politician who is a member of the Seventh Parliament of the Fourth Republic of Ghana representing Tamale South. He served as the Minority Leader for NDC in Ghana's Parliament from January 2017 and was succeeded by Ato Forson.

Early life and education 
Haruna Iddrisu was born in 1970 at Tamale, Ghana.He started his early education at Kulikuli school. Iddrisu studied at the University of Ghana between 1993 and 1997 where he obtained  B.A. (Hons) in Sociology. He was active in student politics and was the President of the National Union of Ghana Students during his final year. Iddrisu is also a barrister and has been a member of the Ghana Bar Association since 2002.

Political career 
After being a student leader for years in his tertiary education period, Iddrisu transitioned into mainstream national politics and rose to become the National Youth Organizer for the National Democratic Congress in 2002. He held that position for 8 years even whilst Minister of Communications until stepping down in 2010 and not seeking reelection.

As Member of Parliament 
He stood for MP in the 2004 parliamentary election in the then newly formed Tamale South constituency.  Iddrisu served as the Ranking Member of the Parliamentary Select Committee on Communications and also the Minority Spokesman on Communications in the fourth Parliament when the National Democratic Congress,his party was in opposition.

He retained his seat in the 2008 parliamentary election by gaining 78.2% of the total votes cast.  He once again retained his seat in the 2012 parliamentary elections by getting 74.6% of the total votes cast.

Even though his party lost the Presidential Elections, Haruna retained his seat in the 2016 Elections and was selected to lead the minority caucus as the Minority Leader of the 7th Parliament of the 4th Republic in Ghana.

Haruna Iddrisu in January 2020, donated a CHPS compound to the Duunyin community in the Northern region of Ghana to provide health care services to the indigents of the community.

As Minister of state 
He has held various positions in government, including Minister for Communications under the Mills and Mahama governments as well as Minister for Trade between 2013 and 2014. He was appointed the Minister for Employment and Labour Relations by President Mahama in July 2014.

Personal life 
He is a married Muslim, has 3 children and hails from the Northern Region of Ghana.

See also 
 List of Mills government ministers
 List of Mahama government ministers
 Tamale South constituency
 Data Protection Act, 2012 (Act 843) – Ghana

References

External links 
 Profile on Ghana government website 
 Profile on Parliament of Ghana website 

Living people
1970 births
Communications ministers of Ghana
Trade ministers of Ghana
Ghanaian MPs 2005–2009
Ghanaian MPs 2009–2013
Ghanaian MPs 2013–2017
University of Ghana alumni
National Democratic Congress (Ghana) politicians
Dagomba people
Ghanaian Muslims
People from Tamale, Ghana
Government ministers of Ghana
Ghanaian MPs 2017–2021
21st-century Ghanaian politicians
21st-century Ghanaian lawyers
Ghanaian MPs 2021–2025